The 1962 Tour de Romandie was the 16th edition of the Tour de Romandie cycle race and was held from 10 May to 13 May 1962. The race started and finished in Geneva. The race was won by Guido De Rosso.

General classification

References

1962
Tour de Romandie
1962 Super Prestige Pernod